Azul were a Cuban professional baseball team. They played from 1904 to 1908 featuring players mostly from the Cuban League. The won the Cuban Summer Championship in 1904 and 1907 under manager Evaristo Plá.

Notable players
Manuel Alfonso
Rafael Almeida
Luis Bustamante
Al Cabrera
Pelayo Chacón
Armando Dacal
Angel D'Meza
Eusebio González
Gervasio González
Heliodoro Hidalgo
Armando Marsans
Emilio Palomino
Esteban Prats
Carlos Royer
Rogelio Valdés

References

External links
Franchise history at Seamheads.com

Defunct baseball teams in Cuba